Glen Louis Savoie is a Canadian politician, who was elected to the Legislative Assembly of New Brunswick in the 2010 provincial election. He represented the electoral district of Saint John-Fundy as a member of the Progressive Conservatives until the 2014 provincial election on September 22, 2014, when he was defeated by Gary Keating in the redistributed riding of Saint John East.

Following Keating's resignation, just 22 days after the election, Savoie ran as the Progressive Conservative candidate in the resulting by-election, and won reelection to the legislature on November 17. Savoie was re-elected in the 2018 and 2020 provincial elections.

Electoral record

|-

References

Progressive Conservative Party of New Brunswick MLAs
Acadian people
Living people
21st-century Canadian politicians
Year of birth missing (living people)
Members of the Executive Council of New Brunswick